Aliabad (also Romanized as ‘Alīābād) is a village in Ekhtiarabad Rural District, in the Central District of Kerman County, Kerman Province, Iran. At the 2006 census, its population was 42, in 10 families.

References 

Populated places in Kerman County